At the Mouth of the River is a folk music compilation album by Australian vocal duo, and sisters, Vika and Linda Bull. Released internationally via Real World Records in June 1996, it provides five previously unreleased songs plus newly recorded versions of previously released ones.

Track listing

 Tracks not previously recorded by Vika and Linda: "Akilotoa", "Raise Your Voices", "Love Me Like a Man", "Que Sera, Sera (Whatever Will Be, Will Be)" and "Two Wings".

Personnel 

Musicians
 Linda Bull – vocals
 Vika Bull – vocals
 Jeff Burstin – guitars (acoustic, electric)
 Bruce Haymes – organ, electric piano
 Stuart Speed – double bass
 John Watson – drums

Recording
 David Bottrill – engineer
 Sam Gibson – assistant engineer

Artwork
 Vince Goodsell – photography
 Stephen Lovell-Davis – photography
 Tristan Manco – design, graphic design
 Amy Robins – design, design assistant

References

Vika and Linda albums
1996 albums
Real World Records albums